The 1975 French motorcycle Grand Prix was the first round of the 1975 Grand Prix motorcycle racing season. It took place on the weekend of 28–30 March 1975 at the Paul Ricard Circuit.

500cc classification

References

French motorcycle Grand Prix
French
Motorcycle Grand Prix